Kevin Wölbert (born 14 June 1989) is a German speedway rider who has won Individual German Champion title in 2008.

Career history
When Max Dilger was injured, Wölbert was nominated as second track reserve at the 2008 German Grand Prix. But, after re-staged this event in Bydgoszcz, Poland (as the Final Grand Prix), Wölbert was replaced by Pole Grzegorz Zengota.

Due to having Polish roots through his grandmother, Wölbert has been interest of Polish citizenship. He applied for citizenship in November 2009 in Kuyavian-Pomeranian Voivodeship Office in Bydgoszcz. His application was support by President of Grudziądz Robert Malinowski and a GTŻ Grudziądz, his Polish team. His application will be consider by the President of the Republic of Poland.

As a Pole, he will be apply for a Polish speedway licence  (Licencja "Ż") and starting in Polish league as a domestic rider.

Speedway Grand Prix results

Career details

World Championships
Speedway Grand Prix
 2008 - as a second track reserve

Speedway World Cup
 2008 - 2nd in Qualifying Round One (8 pts)

Individual U-21 World Championship
 2007 -  Ostrów Wlkp. - 16th place (1 pt)
 2008 - 12th place in Qualifying Round Two
 2009 - 15th place in Semi-Final Two

Team U-21 World Championship
 2006 -  Rybnik - 4th place (6 pts)
 2007 -  Abensberg - 4th place (3 pts)
 2008 - 3rd place in the Qualifying Round Two
 2009 - 2nd place in the Qualifying Round One
 2010 - 3rd place in the Qualifying Round Two

European Championships
Individual European Championship
 2008 7th place in Semi-Final One

Individual U-19 European Championship
 2005 -  Mšeno - 8th place (9 pts)
 2006 -  Goričan - 10th place (6 pts)
 2007 -  Częstochowa - 8th place (8 pts)
 2008 -  Stralsund - 6th place (9 pts)

European Pairs Championship
 2006 -  Lendava - 7th place (3 pts)
 2008 -  Natschbach-Loipersbach - 7th place (1 pt)

Team U-19 European Championship
 2008 -  Rawicz - Runner-up (12 pts)

Domestic competitions
Individual German Championship
 2009 - German Champion

Individual U-21 German Championship
 2008 - 3rd place
 2009 -  Norden - Runner-up

See also
 Germany national speedway team (U21, U19)

References

1989 births
Living people
People from Crivitz
People from Bezirk Schwerin
German speedway riders
Sportspeople from Mecklenburg-Western Pomerania